M1917 may refer to any of a number of types of equipment under the model-year nomenclature:

 M1917 bayonet, the bayonet used with the US M1917 Enfield rifle and later with US Army combat shotguns
 M1917 Browning machine gun, a belt-fed water-cooled machine gun
 M1917 Revolver, a .45 ACP revolver produced by Colt and Smith & Wesson
 M1917 Enfield, an American bolt-action rifle
 M1917 light tank, a light tank in US Army service, a near copy of the Renault FT
 75 mm gun M1917, a US-manufactured variant of the British QF 18-pounder artillery gun
 M1917 155 mm Gun, a US-manufactured version of the French Canon de 155mm GPF in US service
 M1917 155 mm Howitzer, the French Canon de 155 C modèle 1917 Schneider used in US service
 M1917 Helmet, a modified version of the Brodie helmet
 M1917 trench knife

See also 
 M1918 Browning Automatic Rifle, adopted in 1917 but designated M1918 to avoid confusion with other M1917 machine guns

World War I military equipment of the United States